Raghunandan Singh Bhadauria (born 15 July 1962) is an Indian politician and was member of Sixteenth Legislative Assembly of Uttar Pradesh. He won 2012 assembly election from Kanpur Cantt. as BJP candidate.

References

Living people
Politicians from Kanpur
Uttar Pradesh MLAs 2012–2017
Date of birth missing (living people)
Bharatiya Janata Party politicians from Uttar Pradesh
1962 births